Behnuiyeh (also Romanized as Behnū’īyeh and Bahnū’īyeh; also known as Behnow, Behnu, and Chāvārchi) is a village in Madvarat Rural District, in the Central District of Shahr-e Babak County, Kerman Province, Iran. At the 2006 census, its population was 109, in 31 families.

References 

Populated places in Shahr-e Babak County